Hartshorn is the horn of a male red deer.

Hartshorn may also refer to:

 Hartshorn, Alberta, Canada
 Hartshorn, Illinois, U.S.
 Hartshorn, Missouri, U.S.
 Hartshorn Memorial College, Richmond, Virginia, U.S.
 Salt of Hartshorn, Ammonium bicarbonate

People with the surname
 Charles P. Hartshorn (1833–1880), American architect
 Cora Hartshorn (1873–1958), American pioneer in the field of birth control
 David Hartshorn (born 1966), New Zealand cricketer
 Katie-Jane Hartshorn (born 1994), an Australian cricketer
 Larry Hartshorn (1933–2007), American gridiron football player
 Leon R. Hartshorn (1929–2015), religion professor and author
 Michael Hartshorn (1936–2017), British-born New Zealand organic chemist
 Vernon Hartshorn (1872–1931), Welsh trade unionist and Labour Party politician

See also
 
 Hartshorne (disambiguation)